Simon Denyer is a British journalist, author, and wildlife conservationist.  He served as a foreign correspondent and bureau chief for the Washington Post and for Reuters, including in Beijing, New Delhi, Washington, Islamabad, Nairobi, New York and London.

Education 
Denyer graduated from Lancing College in 1983. He earned a master of arts degree in economics from Trinity College, Cambridge in 1987.

Career 
Denyer joined Reuters as a journalist in London in 1992, later becoming bureau chief in Washington, New Delhi, Islamabad and Kabul; also serving as a correspondent in Nairobi, New York and London. He later joined the Washington Post as bureau chief in India, also serving as president of the Foreign Correspondents' Club of South Asia (2011-2013), later transitioning to China's bureau chief (2013-2018), and finally to Japan and the Koreas (2018-2021).

Denyer joined WildAid, an environmental organization, as its Africa programme manager in October 2021.

Criticism of Indian Prime Minister 
Denyer faced criticism in 2012 for his article "India's “silent” prime minister becomes a tragic figure", in which he criticizes former Indian Prime Minister Manmohan Singh. Singh’s media advisor, Pankaj Pachauri, posted in the online comments section after the article was posted, claiming Denyer did not get in contact with the Prime Minister’s Office to get their side of the story. Denyer countered, saying he had requested an interview with the PM three times and wanted to meet senior PMO officials but his requests were ignored or declined. Two quotes from the article first appeared in a 2011 article published by the Indian magazine The Caravan. Originally, the quotes appeared without citation.  Former media advisor Sanjaya Baru and Tushar Poddar, an economist from Goldman Sachs, distanced themselves from the attributed comments.

Denyer admitted that his quotes came from The Caravan but claimed that he spoke to Baru, who gave him permission to use the quotes. The Washington Post printed a correction.

Sexual harassment accusation 
Denyer's sexual harassment accusation during his tenure as the Washington Post's bureau chief in China sparked widespread discussion of the Me Too Movement in journalism when it was made public in 2021.  A female reporter made the accusation in a 2018 WeChat thread among foreign correspondents and diplomats in China who were discussing sexual misconduct allegations against the Los Angeles Times’ then-Beijing bureau chief Jonathan Kaiman. Several male members of the chat attacked Kaiman's accuser, and one female reporter lamented their dismissiveness, claiming that the men in the thread had previously tried to block women from their pick-up soccer matches. After Denyer replied with what the female reporter characterized as "snark," she accused Denyer of having once sent her an unsolicited photo of his pantless crotch. The Washington Post opened an investigation on Denyer and ruled no professional wrongdoing on Denyer's part that warranted dismissal and instead issued him a warning.  Denyer was transferred to Japan that same year.

In September 2021, Denyer resigned from The Washington Post one month after his accusation was made public by The Daily Beast in its coverage of Felicia Sonmez's lawsuit against the Post.   Sonmez accused the newspaper of managerial hypocrisy for having barred her from covering stories on sexual assault because she had come out as a sexual assault survivor, while allowing Denyer to continue coverage of such stories despite his past sexual harassment accusation. James Palmer, a Foreign Policy editor and China correspondent who has documented widespread sexual misconduct among Western journalists in Beijing, responded to the controversy by stating, “It’s extremely fucked up. You treat the victim worse than someone accused of this stuff."

Journalists have also drawn connections between Denyer and the Me Too Movement by noting that Denyer is represented by Boies Schiller Flexner LLP, the same law firm that represented Harvey Weinstein during his 2017 sexual abuse allegations.

References 

Living people
English male journalists
The Washington Post people
Year of birth missing (living people)